Dejon George Franklin Noel-Williams  (born 22 September 1998) is a professional footballer who plays as a forward for Isthmian League club Potters Bar Town. Born in England, he represents the Grenada national team.

Professional career
A youth product of Watford and Oxford United, Noel-Williams spent his early career on various loans to lower league sides. He had stints on loan at Aylesbury United, North Leigh, Chesham United, Slough Town, Gloucester City, and Hayes & Yeading. On 7 June 2019, left Oxford United and signed a contract with Wealdstone. He transferred to Billericay Town on 3 January 2020. He moved to Spain on 27 November 2020, where he signed with Guadalajara. In August 2021, Noel-Williams returned to English football, signing for National League South club Hemel Hempstead Town. He only played two games for the Tudors, before he was on the move again, transferring to National League North side Gloucester City in October 2021, having previously had a loan spell for the club in 2019.

On 4 February 2022, Noel-Williams joined Braintree Town.

On 18 July 2022, following a short spell with Braintree, Noel-Williams made the switch to Potters Bar Town ahead of the 2022–23 campaign.

International career
Born in England, Noel-Williams is of Grenadian descent. He was called up to represent the Grenada national football team for matches in June 2021. He debuted for Grenada in a 1–0 2022 FIFA World Cup qualification loss to Antigua and Barbuda on 4 June 2021.

Personal life
Noel-Williams is the son of the football manager and former footballer Gifton Noel-Williams.

Career statistics

References

External links
 
 
 North Leigh Profile
 

1998 births
Living people
Footballers from Greater London
Grenadian footballers
Grenada international footballers
English footballers
English sportspeople of Grenadian descent
Association football forwards
National League (English football) players
Southern Football League players
Tercera División players
Oxford United F.C. players
Aylesbury United F.C. players
North Leigh F.C. players
Slough Town F.C. players
Chesham United F.C. players
Gloucester City A.F.C. players
Wealdstone F.C. players
Hayes & Yeading United F.C. players
Billericay Town F.C. players
CD Guadalajara (Spain) footballers
Hemel Hempstead Town F.C. players
Braintree Town F.C. players
Potters Bar Town F.C. players
Grenadian expatriate footballers
English expatriate footballers
Expatriate footballers in Spain
English expatriate sportspeople in Spain
Grenadian expatriate sportspeople in Spain
2021 CONCACAF Gold Cup players
English people of Grenadian descent
Black British sportspeople